Governor Reid may refer to:

David Settle Reid (1813–1891), 32nd Governor of North Carolina
Lestock Robert Reid (1799–1878), Governor of Bombay from 1846 to 1847
Robert R. Reid (1789–1841), Territorial Governor of Florida from 1839 to 1841
William Reid (British Army officer) (1791–1858), Governor of the Bermudas from 1839 to 1846, of the British Windward Islands from 1846 to 1848, and of Malta from 1851 to 1858

See also
Governor Reed (disambiguation)